The New Mexico Classic was a golf tournament on the Buy.com Tour from 1999 to 2000. It was played at the Santa Ana Golf Club in Santa Ana Pueblo, New Mexico near Albuquerque.

The purse in 2000 was US$425,000, with $76,500 going to the winner.

Winners

See also
New Mexico Charity Classic - an earlier NIKE Tour event

Former Korn Ferry Tour events
Golf in New Mexico
Sports in Albuquerque, New Mexico
Recurring sporting events established in 1999
Recurring sporting events disestablished in 2000
1999 establishments in New Mexico
2000 disestablishments in New Mexico